Gravelton may refer to:

Gravelton, Indiana
Gravelton, Missouri